Thorpe is a variant of the Middle English word thorp, meaning hamlet or small village.

Thorpe may refer to:

People
 Thorpe (surname), including a list of people with the name

Places

England 
Thorpe, Cumbria
Thorpe, Derbyshire
Thorpe, East Lindsey, Lincolnshire
Thorpe, East Riding of Yorkshire
Thorpe, North Yorkshire
Thorpe, Nottinghamshire
Thorpe, Surrey
Thorpe by Trusthorpe, Lincolnshire
Thorpe Hamlet, Norwich, Norfolk
Thorpe Hesley, South Yorkshire
Thorpe in Balne, South Yorkshire
Thorpe in the Fallows, Lincolnshire
Thorpe Latimer, Lincolnshire
Thorpe-le-Soken, Essex
Thorpe le Street, East Riding of Yorkshire
Thorpe on the Hill, Lincolnshire
Thorpe on the Hill, West Yorkshire
Thorpe St Andrew, Norfolk
Thorpe St Peter, Lincolnshire
Thorpe Tilney, Lincolnshire
Thorpe Waterville, Northamptonshire
Thorpe Willoughby, North Yorkshire

Elsewhere 
Thorpe, Missouri, a community in the United States

See also
Littlethorpe, Leicestershire, England
Littlethorpe, North Yorkshire, England
Little Thorpe, County Durham, England
Little Thorpe, West Yorkshire, a location in England
Thorpe Park (disambiguation)
Dorf (disambiguation)
Dorp (disambiguation)